Cyrtidula is a genus of lichenized fungi in the class Dothideomycetes. The relationship of this taxon to other taxa within the class is unknown (incertae sedis).

Species 

 Cyrtidula americana
 Cyrtidula amphilomatis
 Cyrtidula crataegina
 Cyrtidula elachistoterum
 Cyrtidula euclinis
 Cyrtidula ferax
 Cyrtidula fuscorubella
 Cyrtidula grammatodes
 Cyrtidula hippocastani
 Cyrtidula idaeica
 Cyrtidula larigna
 Cyrtidula limbata
 Cyrtidula macrotheca
 Cyrtidula macularis
 Cyrtidula major
 Cyrtidula microspora
 Cyrtidula minor
 Cyrtidula occulta
 Cyrtidula pinea
 Cyrtidula pityophila
 Cyrtidula populnella
 Cyrtidula quercus
 Cyrtidula rhoica
 Cyrtidula rhypontoides
 Cyrtidula stenospora
 Cyrtidula stigmaea
 Cyrtidula stigmatophora
 Cyrtidula stygnospila
 Cyrtidula subcembrina
 Cyrtidula subpallida
 Cyrtidula tremulicola

See also 
 List of Dothideomycetes genera incertae sedis

References

External links 
 Cyrtidula at Index Fungorum

Dothideomycetes enigmatic taxa
Dothideomycetes genera
Lichen genera